The Pobjoy R is a British seven-cylinder air-cooled radial aircraft engine designed and built by Pobjoy Airmotors. Introduced in 1926, it was a popular engine for ultralight and small aircraft in the 1930s. A notable feature of the Pobjoy R was the propeller reduction gear which allowed the small engine to operate at more desirable higher speeds.

The engine was license produced in Czechoslovakia by Walter Aircraft Engines as the Walter Mira.

Variants
Walter Mira R
License produced version of Pobjoy R. 
Walter Mira I-R
Renaming of Mira R. 
Walter Mira II-R
Developed version of the Mira R producing 95 hp (70 kW).

Applications

Walter Mira
 Letov Š-39
 Letov Š-139

Engines on display
A preserved Pobjoy R engine is on display at the Shuttleworth Collection, Old Warden, Bedfordshire.

Two Pobjoy R engines,  one installed in the remains of Comper Swift (R222 / LV-FBA) will be soon on display at the National Aviation Museum in Buenos Aires Province, Argentina.

Specifications (Pobjoy R)

See also

References

Notes

Bibliography

 Guttery, T.E. The Shuttleworth Collection. London: Wm. Carling & Co, 1969. SBN 901319-01-5
 Lumsden, Alec. British Piston Engines and their Aircraft. Marlborough, Wiltshire: Airlife Publishing, 2003. .

R
1920s aircraft piston engines
Aircraft air-cooled radial piston engines